Milana Maksimauna Ramashova (born 12 September 2005) is a Belarusian figure skater. She is the 2020 Belarusian national silver medalist and a two-time Belarusian junior national champion (2019, 2020). She finished 12th at the 2020 World Junior Championships.

Personal life 
Ramashova was born on 12 September 2005 in Byaroza to Lyudmila and Maksim Ramashov. Her father is a construction worker who used to play for FC Bereza-2010 and her mother was a competitive gymnast. Ramashova has an older brother who plays ice hockey. She has two cats, one of whom is named Button. Ramashova wants to be a skating coach in the future.

Career

Early career 
Ramashova's parents had her start skating in her hometown of Byaroza at the age of four so she would get sick less often. A coach recommended that the family start training in Pruzhany, 40 kilometers away, as there was no sport school in Byaroza.

In 2013, Ramashova began working with her current coach, Olga Uvazhanaia. Several injuries, including a broken arm and a sprained ankle, forced her off the ice for most of 2014, but she recovered to attend the camp of Russian coach Ilia Kalashnikov in Sochi, Russia at the end of the year. Following the camp, Ramashova and her family were impressed with the Russian training system. In 2018, they relocated to Sochi for her to train in Alexei Urmanov's group at the Iceberg Skating Palace in the Sochi Olympic Park.

Ramashova won the 2019 Belarusian junior national title ahead of Aliaksandra Chepeleva and Nastassia Sidarenka. She looks up to Russian skaters Alina Zagitova and Alena Kostornaia.

2019–2020 season 
Ramashova made her junior international debut on the Junior Grand Prix series, finishing 16th in Chelyabinsk and 12th in Gdańsk. In October, she finished 7th at Ice Star in Minsk. At the 2020 Belarusian Championships in December, Ramashova won silver on the senior level behind Viktoriia Safonova and ahead of Nastassia Sidarenka. She then finished fourth at the Mentor Toruń Cup in January.

In February, Ramashova defended her title at the 2020 Belarusian Junior Championships ahead of Anastasiya Balykina and Darya Kapskaya. Her result qualified her for the 2020 World Junior Championships. Ramashova qualified for the final segment at Junior Worlds and finished 12th overall, after placing 12th in the short program and 11th in the free skating, despite not performing a triple flip or triple Lutz jump. She is the first Belarusian lady to qualify for the final segment at the World Junior Championships.

2020–2021 season 
Due to the COVID-19 pandemic, the International Skating Union cancelled the Junior Grand Prix, where the senior-ineligible Ramashova would have competed. She opened her season in October at the 2020 Ice Star, winning silver behind Varvara Kisel and ahead of Lizaveta Balonikova.

Programs

Competitive highlights 
CS: Challenger Series; JGP: Junior Grand Prix

Detailed results 
Small medals for short and free programs awarded only at ISU Championships.

Senior results

Junior results

References

External links 
 

2005 births
Living people
Belarusian female single skaters
People from Byaroza
Sportspeople from Brest Region